Odbojkaški klub Partizan commonly known as OK Partizan, is a volleyball club from Belgrade, Serbia. OK Partizan is a part of JSD Partizan. The club formed in 1946. In its history, Partizan won 11 national championships, 9 cups and 1 supercup. The women club formed in 1950. In its history, it won 9 national championships, 2 cups and 2 supercups. The female team ceased to exist in 1972. but was re-established in 2013.
One of the best volleyball players in the world, Ivan Miljković, started his professional career with OK Partizan.

Honours and achievements

Men
 Serbian Volleyball League :
 Winners (1) : 2011.
 Yugoslav Volleyball Championship :
 Winners (10) : 1946, 1947, 1949, 1950, 1953, 1967, 1973, 1978, 1990, 1991.
 Yugoslav Volleyball Cup :
 Winners  (7) : 1950, 1961, 1964, 1971, 1974, 1989, 1990,
 Serbian Volleyball Cup :
 Winners  (2) : 2022, 2023.
 Serbian Volleyball Supercup :
 Winners  (1) : 2022.

Women

 Yugoslav Volleyball Championship :
 Winners (8) : 1952, 1955, 1956, 1957, 1958, 1960, 1961, 1968.
 Serbian Volleyball Championship : `
 Winners (1) : 2014
 Yugoslav Volleyball Cup :
 Winners (2) : 1959, 1960.
 Serbian Super Cup : 
 Winners (1) : 2013

First Team for 2021/2022 season

Coach : Bojan Janić 

Assistant Coach : Nenad Živanović

Notable former players

  Mihajlo Marković
  Jovan Janković
  Dragomir Popović
  Zlatko Kovačević
  Borivoje Jovanović
  Predrag Okrajnov
  Branko Nedić
  Sava Dedijer
  Danilo Soldatović
  Ivan Trinaestić
  Vasilije Krestić
  Miroslav Vorgić
  Marko Pavlović
  Zoran Živković
  Ratomir Pavlović
  Zoran Petrović
  Sveta Petrović
  Nenad Golijanin
  Radoslav Karaklajić
  Petar Stanišić
  Dragan Rajačić
  Branko Draganić
  Mate Piljić
  Uroš Ribarić
  Milovan Simić
  Dragan Balandžić
  Slavko Balandžić
  Goran Šiljegović
  Miodrag Stanimirović
  Goran Stojmirović
  Ilija Vujović
  Jovica Cvetković
  Dušan Marković
  Zdravko Kuljić
  Milan Žarković
  Željko Bulatović
  Zoran Tijanović
  Vladimir Trifunović
  Branislav Matijašević
  Nenad Đorđević
  Ivan Radivojević
  Nenad Komnenić
  Miodrag Mitić
  Nikola Matijašević
  Mirko Čulić
  Bojan Milić
  Zoran Luković
  Mihajlo Milutinović
  Vladimir Kocić
  Enes Hadžibegović
  Aleksandar Babić
  Dragan Vujović
  Sabahudin Peljto
  Milan Janković
  Željko Tanasković
  Igor Kolaković
  Goran Vujević
  Dragan Kobiljski 
  Nenad Starčević
  Velibor Ivanović
  Vladislav Mandić
  Jasmin Dautović
  Nikola Poluga
  Nemanja Nićiforović
  Uroš Bulatović
  Marko Samardžić
  Bojan Kostadinović
  Bela Trubint
  Ratko Pavličević
  Vladimir Racković
  Srđan Popović
  Vuk Nikčević
  Duško Nikolić
  Vanja Prtenjača
  Vladimir Vasović
  Vladimir Rakić
  Vladimir Gavrilović
  Aleksandar Spirovski
  Branislav Mitrović
  Aleksandar Mitrović
  Vladan Đorđević
  Marko Zlatić
  Ivan Miljković
  Nikola Rosić
  Nebojša Đenić
  Bojan Gluvajić
  Igor Mladenović
  Marko Vujović
  Petar Čurović
  Ilija Mimić
  Duško Novoselac
  Petar Turanjanin
  Dušan Žeželj
  Aleksandar Atanasijević
  Žarko Kisić
  Aleksandar Ljubičić
  Siniša Žarković
  Uglješa Pešut
  Neven Majstorović
  Ivan Ilić
  Svetozar Marković
  Nemanja Balandžić
  Filip Đurković
  Boris Bakalov
  Saša Jović
  Filip Samardžić
  Aleksandar Minić
  Aleksa Brđović
  Ivan Steljić
  Petar Palibrk
  Boris Buša
  Vladimir Miljkovic

Notable former coaches

  Dragomir Popović
  Ivan Trinaestić
  Mihajlo Marković
  Zlatko Kovačević
  Dragoljub Babić
  Dragoslav Sirotanović
  Drago Tomić
  Lazar Grozdanović
  Miroslav Vorgić
  Petar Stanišić
  Sava Grozdanović
  Marko Pavlović
  Nikola Matijašević
  Branko Draganić
  Ljubomir Aćimović
  Radoslav Karaklajić
  Slavoljub Marković
  Vladimir Bogojevski
  Jovan Vukalović
  Bogdan Sretenović
  Dragan Balandžić
  Goran Janošević
  Željko Bulatović
  Milan Žarković
  Dejan Vulićević
  Milan Đuričić
  Katarina Kamen Ivkovic

See also
ŽOK Partizan

References

External links
 Team profile at Wienerliga.org
 Team profile at CEV.lu

Serbian volleyball clubs
Sport in Belgrade
Volleyball clubs established in 1946

fr:Partizan Belgrade